Junction 88 is a 1948 American musical film, telling the story of an aspiring songwriter. It was directed by George P. Quigley. The film is part of the Smithsonian National Museum of African American History and Culture collection. The 16 mm film captured on acetate runs 50 minutes.

J. Augustus Smith and Herbert Junior wrote the songs.

Cast
Bob Howard 
Dewey "Pigmeat" Markham
Noble Sissel
Wyatt Clark as Buster
Marie Cooke a Lolly
Gus Smith as Pop
Abbie Mitchell as Mom
Artie Belle McGinty as Mrs. Jenkins
George Wiltshire as Reverend Juniper
Herbert Junior as Onnie
Alonso Bosan as (Alonzo Bozan) as Charlie
Maude Simmons as Lady
Al Young  as Old Man
Augustus Smith Jr. As Chinka Pin

References

Further reading
AFI catalog entry

External links
Full film at Youtube.com

1948 musical films